Alesia Fieldberg is a Canadian journalist currently working with CTV Calgary  as a reporter and anchor. She came to Calgary after working for CTV Winnipeg. Prior to Winnipeg she worked at CTV Lethbridge. Before CTV she hosted an Alberta Travel show for Shaw TV.

Early life
Fieldberg holds an International Relations Degree from the University of Calgary and graduated from the Broadcast News program at the Southern Alberta Institute of Technology.
Fieldberg was selected Miss Canada International 2008 on August 18, 2007.  She was previously selected "Miss Calgary, AB" on March 17, 2007.

References

External links

Alesia Fieldberg on Twitter

Canadian beauty pageant winners
Canadian television reporters and correspondents
Living people
People from Calgary
Year of birth missing (living people)
Canadian women television journalists